The Dale River is a river that flows through County Westmeath and County Meath Ireland. The rivers source is at Lough Lene, it then flows for 19 miles before meeting the River Boyne, meeting it near the town of Clonard, County Meath.

References 

Rivers of County Meath
Rivers of County Westmeath